Fred (Toucher) Toettcher (born 1975) is a Marconi-winning sports radio talk show host on WBZ-FM in Boston, co-hosting "Toucher and Rich" with Rich Shertenlieb.

Biography
A native of Detroit, Toettcher graduated from Rollins College in 1997.  After graduating, he landed a job at a small radio station in Cumming, Georgia. In 1999, he started hosting nights on 99X in Atlanta and eventually worked his way to the morning show. In 2006, after leaving his show in Atlanta he and Rich Shertenlieb started The Toucher and Rich Show together on WBCN in Boston. In 2009, the show moved to 98.5 The Sports Hub. While initially thought to be moved to the station as a fill-in while the station tried to assemble a more sports-oriented program, The Toucher and Rich Show quickly rose to prominence and is considered to be one of the most popular radio shows in New England. In the 2018 fall Nielsen Audio ratings for Boston, the show took first place in the morning drive category with a 10.5 share.

Though not necessarily considered a shock jock, Toettcher has been involved in a few controversies. In May 2005, he prodded a caller to tell listeners the ending to a recently released Harry Potter and the Half-Blood Prince. In April 2010, he referred to overtly Christian quarterback Tim Tebow's NFL Draft party as "resembling a lily-white Nazi gathering". In October 2013, he hung up on Rick Pitino. In 2019, Toucher hung up on Carolina reporter Chip Alexander, claiming that he "just can't listen to a guy with a southern accent talk hockey."

Toettcher occasionally feuded with John Dennis of former rival morning show Dennis and Callahan, who often called him a hipster and referred to Toettcher as "Fred Douchebag." Toettcher usually responded by mocking Dennis's age and citing the fact that The Toucher and Rich Show consistently beat Dennis and Callahan in Boston radio market ratings, usually by a substantial margin.

Toettcher has lived just outside Boston since 2005, with his wife Stephanie, daughter Zoey, and son Milo.. In October 2022, he announced his pending divorce.  Recently Toettcher has publicly battled alcoholism and openly discussed his time spent in rehabilitation both on Instagram and on the Toucher and Rich radio show, depicting his path to sobriety in a comedic and inspiring way.

References

External links
CBS Boston profile

Living people
American sports radio personalities
Radio personalities from Boston
Rollins College alumni
Sports in Boston
People from Cumming, Georgia
1975 births